Eğribucak is a village in the Hassa District, Hatay Province, Turkey. The village had a population of 669 in 2022.

In late 19th century, German orientalist Martin Hartmann listed the village as a settlement of 38 houses inhabited by Turks and 12 houses by Armenians (including Armenian Catholics).

References

Villages in Hassa District